The 69th UWW European Wrestling Championships was held in Kaspiysk, Dagestan, Russia, between 30 April and 6 May 2018.

Medal table

Team ranking

Medal summary

Men's freestyle

Men's Greco-Roman

Women's freestyle

Participating nations
On 3 March 2018, UWW Europe, which includes 48 nations, accepted applications for the championships. On 13 March, Ukraine and Great Britain announced they would not participate at the championships due to political reasons. However, on 16 April the Ukrainian Wrestling Association overruled their decision.

References

External links
Official website
Results book

 
Europe
European Wrestling Championships
European Wrestling Championships
2018 European Wrestling Championships
Wrestling Championships
Sport in Dagestan
April 2018 sports events in Russia
May 2018 sports events in Russia